Nineveh Creek is a stream in Johnson and Bartholomew counties, Indiana, in the United States.

Nineveh Creek was named for Nineveh Berry, a pioneer who fell into the creek while in pursuit of a deer.

See also
List of rivers of Indiana

References

Rivers of Bartholomew County, Indiana
Rivers of Johnson County, Indiana
Rivers of Indiana